The Troubleshooters is the third studio album by the Los Angeles-based Latin hip hop group Funkdoobiest, released in 1998. It was the group's first album without Tomahawk Funk. Unlike their previous two albums, there is no production by their mentor DJ Muggs. 

"Papi Chulo" features Tha Dogg Pound member Daz Dillinger.

Critical reception
The Hartford Courant noted "the relative lack of filler and the DJ Ralph M.'s original approach to samples." The Chicago Tribune wrote: "Opting to entertain rather than overwhelm, Funkdoobiest's third album wins with laughs and their trademark off-kilter presentation ... '!Oyi Papi!' is hard-core Latino hip-hop at its finest." The Austin American-Statesman stated: "Sampling from a brightly colored sonic palette of beats, cultures, languages and guest MCs ... Funkdoobiest has created the ultimate urban cruisin' soundtrack—on which the moods change as fast as the passing landscape."

Track listing

Sample credits
Papi Chulo
"Hot" by Squirrel Nut Zippers
"Get Up, Get into It, Get Involved" by James Brown
Act on It
"Jam on It" by Newcleus
Holdin' It Down
"Capsule" by William S. Fischer
Doobie Knows
"Ain't No Sunshine" by Tom Jones

Charts

References

External links

1998 albums
Funkdoobiest albums
RCA Records albums
Albums produced by Da Beatminerz
Albums produced by Ski Beatz